Phil Andrews (born 20 December 1966) is a British former racing driver from Birmingham.

Andrews began his professional career in Formula Ford then raced in the British Formula Three Championship in 1987 where he finished 18th. He returned for a full season in 1988 but failed to score points. In 1989 he raced in International Formula 3000 for Middlebridge and failed to score in 9 starts. He returned to the series in 1990 with Superpower Engineering but again failed to score in 8 starts. In 1991 he raced in British Formula 3000 for Superpower and finished sixth in points. He returned to International F3000 in 1992 with Vortex and again failed to register points in nine starts. He raced part-time in both International F3000 and British F2 (formerly British F3000) in 1993. He was the runner up in the 1994 British F2 season and drove in his first 24 Hours of Le Mans for ADA Engineering. He made sporadic sports car appearances in 1995 and 1996 and was away from racing until 2000, when he raced in the National Saloon Cup and finished seventh in a Ford Focus. In 2002, he raced in EuroBOSS driving a Benetton and finished third in the championship. He made assorted sports car starts for Taurus Sports Racing in 2003 and 2004, including his first American Le Mans Series appearance. In 2006 he competed in Ferrari Challenge Europe, which would be his last racing appearance.

Complete 24 Hours of Le Mans results

References

1966 births
Living people
English racing drivers
International Formula 3000 drivers
24 Hours of Le Mans drivers
British Formula 3000 Championship drivers
American Le Mans Series drivers
Sportspeople from Birmingham, West Midlands
World Sportscar Championship drivers